The 1984 Davies & Tate British Open Championships was held at Wembley Squash Centre in London from 3–10 April 1984. Jahangir Khan won his third consecutive title defeating Qamar Zaman in the final. Hiddy Jahan represented England from 1984.

Seeds

Draw and results

Final
 Jahangir Khan beat  Qamar Zaman 9-0 9-3 9-5

Section 1

Section 2

References

Men's British Open Squash Championships
Men's British Open Championship
Men's British Open Squash Championship
Men's British Open Squash
Men's British Open Squash Championship
Squash competitions in London